The following is an alphabetical list of members of the United States House of Representatives from the state of Arkansas.  For chronological tables of members of both houses of the United States Congress from the state (through the present day), see United States congressional delegations from Arkansas.  The list of names should be complete, but other data may be incomplete.

Current members
 – Rick Crawford (R) (since 2011)
 – French Hill (R) (since 2015)
 – Steve Womack (R) (since 2011)
 – Bruce Westerman (R) (since 2015)

List of representatives

See also

 List of United States senators from Arkansas
 United States congressional delegations from Arkansas
 Arkansas's congressional districts

References

Arkansas
United States Representatives